Bourda, or officially Georgetown Cricket Club Ground, is a cricket ground in Georgetown, Guyana, used by the Guyanese cricket team for matches with other nations in the Caribbean as well as some Test matches involving the West Indies. The ground is one of the two cricket stadiums in the South American mainland and is uniquely surrounded by a moat for flood-prevention and drainage reasons.

History
The stadium is located in Bourda in Georgetown, Guyana between Regent Street and North Road, and is home to the Georgetown Cricket Club (GCC). The ground is reminiscent of old baseball stadiums, due to its cantilever stands. The Ladies stand is notable, but the more modern, such as the Rohan Kanhai stand, blend in well. The liveliest part of the ground with the ubiquitous music and DJs is at The Mound, an unprotected area. The ground was dubbed "The Cornerstone" in 1930 after a game against visiting England.

While the crowd are passionate about their cricket, they are also among the most volatile, with mini riots and pitch invasions not uncommon. The worst incident was in 1979 during a World Series Cricket SuperTest when the pavilion was ransacked and players hid in the changing rooms wearing their helmets for added protection. There would be a similar incident in 1999, when the West Indies, hosted Australia at the ground, with Australia needing 3 to tie and 4 to win off the last ball of the match, there was a full scale pitch invasion with Australian captain Steve Waugh's bat almost being stolen from his grasp and the match deemed a tie, after the West Indies, could not effect a run out, due to the stumps having been stolen after Shane Warne, had made his ground on the second run. Due to the volatile nature of the crowd, the result was not announced until after the players had left the venue.

It has hosted 30 Test matches and 10 One Day International. Four of the last five Tests at the ground have ended in draws. The ground, which has a capacity of around 10,000, opened in 1884, has seen Test cricket since 1930, and is the only cricket stadium in the world to be situated below sea level. The ground has a moat round it to protect the pitch from flooding. It is the oldest ground in the Caribbean.

Cricket matches between Trinidad and GCC were played there as early as 1883, and later between GCC and teams from Britain, in 1895 and 1897. It hosted its first Test in February 1930 against England, which the home side won by 289 runs and George Headley scored a century in each innings.  Clive Lloyd and Rohan Kanhai have stands named after them at Bourda.

The ground did not host matches for the 2007 Cricket World Cup, as a new stadium, the Providence Stadium, was built. The Guyanese authorities, however, insisted that the Bourda would still be used for first-class cricket.

See also
List of Test cricket grounds
List of international cricket five-wicket hauls at Bourda

References

External links 
 Cricinfo
 Cricketarchive

Houses completed in 1884
Test cricket grounds in the West Indies
Cricket grounds in Guyana
Georgetown, Guyana
Football venues in Georgetown, Guyana